André Garin (May 7, 1822 – February 16, 1895) was an Oblate missionary and parish priest.

He was born in La Côte-Saint-André, Isère, France. He received his education at the lesser seminary of his native town, and entered the Order of the Missionary Oblates of Mary Immaculate on November 1, 1842. As he was still too young to be admitted to the priesthood, he was sent to Canada, where he was ordained on April 25, 1845, by Bishop Bourget of Montreal. During a period of twelve years he devoted himself to the Indian missions of Eastern Canada, after which he occupied the post of superior successively at Plattsburgh and at Buffalo, New York.

His services were especially valuable in his early fields of labour, as he had mastered both the Montagnais and the English languages. He was subsequently ordered to commence needed organize parish and mission work among the French Canadians in Lowell, Massachusetts. In a short time his good sense, courteous manner, and kindly disposition won for him a wonderful influence over his people. During a pastorate of some twenty-five years he built costly churches and commodious school edifices; he also established several religious confraternities among his parishioners. Grateful for all he had done for them, the members of his parish erected a statue to him two years after his death.

References
  cites:
Notices nécrologiques des Oblats de Marie Immaculée (Bar-le-Duc, 1899), VII.

19th-century French Roman Catholic priests
French Roman Catholic missionaries
1822 births
1895 deaths
Roman Catholic missionaries in the United States
Roman Catholic missionaries in Canada
French expatriates in Canada
French expatriates in the United States
Missionary Oblates of Mary Immaculate